Papa, maman, ma femme et moi , is a French comedy film from 1955, directed by Jean-Paul Le Chanois, written by Marcel Aymé, starring Robert Lamoureux and Louis de Funès. The film is known under the titles: Papa, Mama, My Wife and Me (UK), Papa, Mama, My Woman and Me (International English title), Papà, mammà, mia moglie ed io (Italy), and Papa, Mama, meine Frau und ich (West Germany).

Cast 
 Robert Lamoureux as Robert Langlois, son, lawyer
 Gaby Morlay as Gabrielle Langlois, mother
 Fernand Ledoux as Fernand Langlois, father
 Nicole Courcel as Catherine Langlois, wife of Robert
 Elina Labourdette as Marguerite, the florist
 Jean Tissier as Mr. Petitot, former lawyer, property adviser
 Robert Rollis as Léon "Alibi", Robert's friend
 Louis de Funès as Mr. Calomel, neighbour of the Langlois family
 Renée Passeur as the lady visiting the apartment
 Luc Andrieux as the removal man
 Mylène Demongeot as The woman at the door

See also 
 Papa, Mama, the Maid and I (1954)

References

External links 
 
 Papa, maman, ma femme et moi (1956) at the Films de France

1955 films
1955 comedy films
French comedy films
1950s French-language films
Films directed by Jean-Paul Le Chanois
Films with screenplays by Marcel Aymé
French black-and-white films
French sequel films
1950s French films